The Famous Idaho Potato Bowl, previously the Humanitarian Bowl (1997–2003, 2007–2010) and the MPC Computers Bowl (2004–2006), is an NCAA-sanctioned post-season college football bowl game that has been played annually since 1997 at Albertsons Stadium on the campus of Boise State University in Boise, Idaho. The game is televised nationally on the ESPN family of networks. Cincinnati defeated Utah State in the inaugural game in 1997.

History

Conference tie-ins
The Humanitarian Bowl was launched in part to give the Big West Conference a bowl to send its champion to. From 1982 until the end of the 1996 season, the Big West champion faced the winner of the Mid-American Conference (MAC) championship in a bowl; this was the California Bowl until 1991 and the Las Vegas Bowl afterward. After the 1996 game the Las Vegas Bowl renegotiated its contract, forcing both conferences to look for other options. This led to the creation of the Humanitarian Bowl as well as the creation of the Detroit-based Motor City Bowl, where the MAC was to send its champion.

From 1997 to 1999, the Big West champion was matched with a team from Conference USA (C-USA), while in 2000 the Western Athletic Conference (WAC) sent a representative. The Big West stopped sponsoring football after the 2000 season, and bowl organizers extended a permanent invite to the WAC to replace the Big West as host of the game, and struck an agreement with the Atlantic Coast Conference (ACC) to provide a bowl-eligible team if it had yet to fill its bowl allotment. The WAC champion would receive the automatic bid to the game unless that team received a better offer from another bowl game or qualified for the Bowl Championship Series (BCS).

The WAC and ACC met in the 2001 through 2008 editions of the bowl, except for 2002 when the ACC's slot was filled by Iowa State of the Big 12 Conference. In 2009, the Mountain West Conference was to provide a team, but Mountain West champion TCU was selected for the Fiesta Bowl and the conference did not have enough bowl-eligible teams to send a replacement; as a result, Bowling Green of the Mid-American Conference (MAC) was invited. In 2010, the bowl inherited the MAC's International Bowl tie-in after that Toronto-based bowl folded; the bowl featured a MAC vs. WAC matchup through 2012.

After the WAC stopped sponsoring football in 2012, Mountain West inherited its spot as host, reaching agreement with the bowl to provide a team, starting with the December 2013 edition. The bowl featured MAC vs. Mountain West matchups in the 2013 through 2015 games. In 2016, the bowl invited in-state Idaho of the Sun Belt Conference in place of a MAC team. The 2017 edition returned to MAC vs. Mountain West, while in the 2018 edition, independent BYU was invited in place of a Mountain West team. In late July 2019, it was announced that the Mountain West and Mid-American Conferences would maintain their tie-ins to the bowl through the 2025–26 football season. The December 2020 edition included the first invitation to a team from the American Athletic Conference (AAC or "The American").

Sponsors
The game originally named for the Idaho-based World Sports Humanitarian Hall of Fame. It was sponsored by Micron Technology, an Idaho-based manufacturer, from 1999 to 2002 under the name Crucial.com, which sold computer memory upgrades from Micron. The bowl game then briefly had no sponsor for the January 2004 game. In December 2004, the name was changed to the MPC Computers Bowl. MPC Computers, which is also based in Idaho, was formerly MicronPC, the computer manufacturing division of Micron, but was later split off as a separate company. In April 2007, it was announced that the bowl would again be called the Humanitarian Bowl. In May 2007, Boise-based Roady's Truck Stops was announced as the new sponsor, thus renaming the game the Roady's Humanitarian Bowl. On May 25, 2010, uDrove, a maker of applications for the transportation industry, became the sponsor of the Humanitarian Bowl, signing a four-year agreement to replace Roady's. On August 3, 2011, the Idaho Potato Commission (IPC) signed a six-year naming rights deal to sponsor the bowl, renaming it the Famous Idaho Potato Bowl. In December 2017, IPC announced that they would be sponsoring the bowl for an additional five years.

The game is the longest running cold weather bowl game currently in operation. The payout is $750,000, but teams are required to provide a corporate sponsor, purchase a minimum number of tickets, and stay at a selected hotel for a minimum stay. Because of this, 7–4 UCLA declined an invitation to the 2001 Humanitarian Bowl.

Highway Angel
From 2008 through 2012, bowl organizers, in conjunction with the Truckload Carriers Association, featured a "Highway Angel of the Year" to game attendees. Highway Angels are truck drivers who performed a heroic feat to save the life of another motorist.

Game results

Source:
 The December 2020 game was played behind closed doors without fans, due to the COVID-19 pandemic.

MVPs

From 1997 through 2014, the bowl named an MVP from each team; since 2015, a single MVP has been named.

Most appearances

Boise State, the game's host school, is tied with Idaho for most wins with three. Boise State, Utah State, and Nevada share the most appearances, with four each (Boise State last played in the bowl , in 2005). Idaho was a member of a different conference for each of its three appearances (Big West in 1998, WAC in 2009, and Sun Belt in 2016).

Of the current 12 members of Mountain West, nine have appeared in the bowl—Air Force, Boise State, Colorado State, Fresno State, Nevada, San Diego State, San Jose State, Utah State, and Wyoming—either as members of Mountain West or the WAC. The three that have yet to play are Hawaii, New Mexico and UNLV.

The below summary has been updated through the December 2022 edition (26 games, 52 total appearances).

Teams with multiple appearances

Teams with a single appearance
Won (11): Air Force, Akron, Boston College, BYU, Cincinnati, Clemson, Eastern Michigan, Maryland, Miami, Northern Illinois, San Diego State

Lost (15): Bowling Green, Buffalo, Central Michigan, Colorado State, Iowa State, Kent State, Louisiana Tech, Louisville, San Jose State, Southern Miss, Toledo, Tulane, Tulsa, UTEP, Virginia

Appearances by conference
Updated through the December 2022 edition (26 games, 52 total appearances).

 Games marked with an asterisk (*) were played in January of the following calendar year.
 Records reflect conference membership at the time each game was played.
 Conferences that are defunct or no longer active in FBS are marked in italics.
 Independent appearances: BYU (2018)

Game records

Source:

Media coverage

The bowl has been televised on ESPN or ESPN2 since its inception.

References

External links
 Official website

 
College football bowls
Sports in Boise, Idaho
Recurring sporting events established in 1997
1997 establishments in Idaho
College sports in Idaho